Military units in South Africa have a long tradition of using unit insignia to visually identify themselves through the use of helmet and shoulder flashes, as well as hackles. This page serves as an informative overview of the various flashes and hackles utilized by different military units in the South African Military. The insignia were predominantly worn from the post-World War I period until approximately 1943, when the use of cloth helmets ceased and were replaced by berets in the Union Defence Force (UDF). These visual symbols represent the identities and histories of each unit and are unique in their design and colors. The page provides detailed descriptions and images of the different flashes and hackles, as well as their origins and meanings.

Description

As a general guide to flashes of the period, the colours had meaning. For Corps/Arm of service, these were, generally, the following:
 Grey - Mounted Units
 Black - Infantry
 Yellow - Artillery

The bottom colour would be the arm of service, the top colour the province.

 Blue - Natal
 Yellow - OVS
 Red - Cape 
 Green - Transvaal

Reserve Force

Active Citizen Force (ACF)

Volunteer Units (1939-1945)

Divisional Flashes (1940-1945)

Notes

References

See also 
 South African Army corps and branches
 List of badges of the South African Army

Military insignia
South African military-related lists
Emblems of the South African Army